Atomopteryx solanalis, the carabid moth, is a moth in the family Crambidae. It is found in North America, where it has been recorded from Florida. The species was first described by William Barnes and James Halliday McDunnough in 1913.

References

Moths described in 1913
Spilomelinae
Moths of North America